Ilori (meaning "Special Treasure" in Yoruba) is a surname. Notable people with the surname include:

Solomon Ilori (born 1934), Nigerian drummer
Tiago Ilori (born 1993), Portuguese football player

Yoruba-language surnames